Wadha Al-Balushi (born 30 November 1989) is an Omani sports shooter. She competed in the women's 10 metre air pistol event at the 2016 Summer Olympics, where she finished 26th with a score of 379. She did not advance to the final.

References

External links
 

1989 births
Living people
Omani female sport shooters
Olympic shooters of Oman
Shooters at the 2016 Summer Olympics
Place of birth missing (living people)
Shooters at the 2014 Asian Games
Shooters at the 2018 Asian Games
Asian Games competitors for Oman
People from Al-Rustaq